Major Derrick le Poer Trench  (25 May 1882 – 27 August 1917) was a British Army officer and recipient of the Military Cross.

Trench was born in 1882, the son of Colonel Stewart Trench. He was educated at Bloxham School in Oxfordshire and the Royal Military Academy, Woolwich.

Trench was commissioned into the Royal Artillery in 1900, being promoted to captain in 1912. He served with the Guards Division Artillery during the First World War and was promoted to major in 1915. He was awarded the Military Cross the same year. Trench was mentioned in dispatches four times during the war, on 22 June 1915, 1 January and 15 June 1916, and 11 December 1917. He was made a Companion of the Distinguished Service Order in 1917. He was killed, alongside Brigadier-General Malcolm Peake, by a German shell on 27 August 1917.

References

1882 births
1917 deaths
Royal Artillery officers
British Army personnel of World War I
Companions of the Distinguished Service Order
Recipients of the Military Cross
People educated at Bloxham School
Graduates of the Royal Military Academy, Woolwich
British military personnel killed in World War I